Francis David Kelly (8 December 1892 – 5 May 1919) was a Scottish professional footballer who played as an outside right in the Scottish League for Motherwell and Celtic.

Personal life 
Kelly was the son of former Celtic player and chairman James Kelly, while his younger brother Robert also served the club as chairman. He served as a private in the Cameronians (Scottish Rifles) during the First World War. Kelly survived the war, but was killed trying to jump onto a train in Montargis, France on 5 May 1919. He was buried in Montargis Communal Cemetery.

Career statistics

References 

Scottish footballers
Scottish Football League players
1892 births
1919 deaths
British Army personnel of World War I
Footballers from Glasgow
Association football outside forwards
Cameronians soldiers
Blantyre Victoria F.C. players
Motherwell F.C. players
Celtic F.C. players
Scottish Junior Football Association players
Railway accident deaths in France